The Naked Dawn is a 1955 American Technicolor Western film directed by Edgar G. Ulmer starring Arthur Kennedy and Betta St. John.

Plot
The story focuses on a poor but proud farmer named Manuel and his wife Maria. When glib-tongued drifter Santiago tries to get Manuel mixed up in a robbery, the farmer is at first resistant, but is goaded into joining Santiago. Corrupted by the prospect of untold wealth, Manuel begins plotting the murder of Santiago; meanwhile, Maria makes plans to run off with the handsome stranger.

Cast
 Arthur Kennedy as Santiago
 Betta St. John as Maria Lopez
 Eugene Iglesias as Manuel Lopez
 Charlita as Tita
 Roy Engel as Guntz
 Tony Martinez as Vicente
 Francis McDonald as Railroad guard

Additional information
 Shot in ten days.
 François Truffaut cited this film as an inspiration for the characters in Jules and Jim.

See also
List of American films of 1955

References

External links
 
 
 
 

1955 films
American Western (genre) films
1955 Western (genre) films
Universal Pictures films
Films directed by Edgar G. Ulmer
Films scored by Herschel Burke Gilbert
1955 drama films
1950s English-language films
1950s American films